Lu Muzhen (30 July 1867 – 7 September 1952) was the first wife of Chinese revolutionary Sun Yat-sen.

Background
Lu Muzhen was born on 30 July 1867. She married Sun in 1885 and bore him a son, Sun Fo, and two daughters, Sun Yan and Sun Wan. Due to her bound feet, she rarely accompanied Sun on his revolutionary campaigns.

After Sun divorced her in 1915 to marry Soong Ching-ling, she moved to Portuguese Macau, where she remained until her death on 7 September 1952.

1867 births
1952 deaths
People from Zhongshan
Sun Yat-sen family
Spouses of national leaders
First ladies of the Republic of China
Chinese Protestants
Macau Christians
Deaconesses